Darrington is a small village and civil parish in the City of Wakefield in West Yorkshire, England,  from Pontefract and  from the city of York. The village is split in two by the busy A1 trunk road which runs from London to Scotland.  The 2011 census population was 1,408.

History
The history of Darrington can be traced back to the time of Edward the Confessor.
The last Anglo Saxon owners of Darrington were named Jordan, Baret and Alsi. After the Norman conquest it fell to the ownership of Ilbert de Lacy,  a favourite of William the Conqueror.

Notable residents
Novelist, historian and Fellow of the Royal Historical Society, J. S. Fletcher (Joseph Smith Fletcher) was brought up in Darrington.

Darrington today
At the heart of the village is the village shop, the Spread Eagle pub, church and the school.  Darrington Church of England Junior & Infant School has about 100 pupils. The Old School and Dovecote are now houses, and the mediaeval Tithe Barn is between the Old School and the church, now in a state of disrepair.

Darrington is home to the Mid-Yorkshire Golf Club, the Kyte Hotel, the Darrington pub and hotel, the Spread Eagle public house, a branch of Ripon Farm Services and Darrington Quarries.

The village has a community playing field which is home to the 'Feast and Fayre' once a year; this has a collection of stalls, a bouncy castle, dancing and many other types of entertainment. There is also a 5-mile run on the same day. This event brings in visitors from surrounding villages and raise money for the upkeep of the field and the purchase of new play equipment, etc.

Although the Holly Cottage Post Office has closed, a post office is available on Monday and Thursday mornings on Phillips Lane. There have been many post office moves in the village. According to the Post Office Archives, the first post office in the village was opened in 1888; in 1889, it gained permission to deal with money orders.

St Luke and All Saints Church
Next to the school is the 13th century parish church of St Luke and All Saints, for the parish of Darrington with Wentbridge in the Benefice of the Went Valley. Booklets of monumental inscriptions from the churchyard and that of Wentbridge are available here from the Pontefract & District Family History Society. Church records are kept at the West Yorkshire County Archives. The building was restored in 1855, and local people including antiquarians complained strongly of damage to historical features. Fine workmanship on rare stone effigies in the north chancel aisle had been "obliterated" by liberal use of whitewash. A Norman arch between nave and tower had been partially removed to make way for a large pew. A "considerable quantity" of carved oak furniture and woodwork had been sold and dispersed. A "highly interesting stone effigy of a "recumbent figure in armour" had "mysteriously disappeared."

See also
Listed buildings in Darrington, West Yorkshire

Notes

Sources
Fletcher, Joseph Smith, (1917), Memorials of a Yorkshire Parish, Old Hall Press, Leeds (facsimile) 1993

External links

 Darrington Church website
Darrington Parish Council website
Village of Darrington
Pontefract & District Family History Society
Darrington Village Field Trust

Villages in West Yorkshire
Geography of the City of Wakefield
Civil parishes in West Yorkshire